Abiel Leonard (June 26, 1848 – December 3, 1903) was the second bishop of the Episcopal Diocese of Utah, serving from 1888 to 1903. He was succeeded by Franklin Spencer Spalding.

Biography
Abiel Leonard was born in Fayette, Missouri on June 26, 1848.

He attended Washington University in St. Louis, Dartmouth College, and the General Theological Seminary.

He married Flora Terry Thompson on October 21, 1875, and they had five children.

Abiel Leonard died from typhoid fever in Salt Lake City on December 3, 1903.

References

1848 births
1903 deaths
20th-century Anglican bishops in the United States
Dartmouth College alumni
19th-century Anglican bishops in the United States
People from Fayette, Missouri
General Theological Seminary alumni
Washington University in St. Louis alumni
Episcopal bishops of Utah
Episcopal bishops of Nevada
Episcopal bishops of Western Colorado